Empress Mu may refer to:

Empress Wu (Zhaolie) (died 245), posthumously known as Empress Mu, wife of the Shu Han emperor Liu Bei
Empress Yang (Lü Zuan's wife) (died 401), posthumously known as Empress Mu, wife of the Later Liang emperor Lü Zuan
Mu Sheli ( 570–577), wife of the Northern Qi emperor Gao Wei